USNS Point Loma may refer to the following ships of the United States Navy:

 USS Point Loma (AGDS-2) (formerly USNS Point Barrow (T-AKD-1)), a decommissioned US Navy deep submergence support ship. 
 , a Spearhead-class expeditionary fast transport on order for the US Navy.

United States Navy ship names